Koroknay  is a surname of Hungarian origin. Notable people with the surname include:

Stephen Koroknay ( 1946–2013), Hungarian-Australian oil company executive
Alex Koroknay-Palicz, American rights activist
Géza Koroknay (1948–2013), Hungarian actor

Hungarian-language surnames